Qarah Su (also Romanized as Qarah Sū, Qarā Sū, and Qareh Sū; also known as Kerāshu) is a village in Rahjerd-e Sharqi Rural District, Salafchegan District, Qom County, Qom Province, Iran. At the 2006 census, its population was 15, in 5 families.

References 

Populated places in Qom Province